Fred or Frederick Griffiths may refer to:

 Fred Griffiths (rugby league) (died 2000), rugby league footballer and coach
 Fred Griffiths (footballer) (1876–1917), Welsh association football player
 Fred Griffiths (actor) (1912–1994), English film and television actor
 Frederick Augustus Griffiths (died 1869), British Army officer and military writer